Teodoro Pons Domínguez (21 December 1896 – 1968) was a Spanish long-distance runner. He competed in the men's 5000 metres at the 1920 Summer Olympics.

References

1896 births
1968 deaths
Athletes (track and field) at the 1920 Summer Olympics
Spanish male long-distance runners
Olympic athletes of Spain